Traquairaspis is a genus of extinct heterostracan agnathan fish known from the Silurian and Early Devonian periods.  It is predominantly known from Late Silurian fluvial deposits from Wales and England: some species were also found in shallow water marine environment in Canada and North America.

The head-shield and body armor of most species form an almond shape.  Plates have a distinctive ornamentation of tubercles: this ornamentation is very similar to the plate ornamentation of the heterostracan Weigeltaspis.  This similarity of ornamentation creates much confusion over the taxonomical placement of Weigeltaspis, in addition to confusion over whether or not an isolated plate is of Traquairaspis, or of Weigeltaspis.

The generic name honors Ramsay Heatley Traquair.

References

Heterostraci genera
Devonian jawless fish
Silurian jawless fish
Devonian fish of North America
Silurian fish of North America
Fossils of Canada
Fossils of the United States
Silurian first appearances
Devonian extinctions